The 1-millimeter band is a portion of the EHF (microwave) radio spectrum internationally allocated to amateur radio and amateur satellite use.  The band is between 241 GHz and 250 GHz.

Due to the lack of commercial off the shelf radios, amateurs who operate on the 1 mm band must design and construct their own equipment, and those who do, often attempt to set communication distance records for the band.

Allocation 
The International Telecommunication Union allocates 241 GHz to 250 GHz to amateur radio and amateur satellites.  Amateurs operate on a primary basis between 248 GHz and 250 GHz and on a secondary basis in the rest of the band.  As such, amateurs must protect the radio astronomy and radiolocation services from harmful interference, which share the band with amateurs between 241 GHz and 248 GHz.  In addition, 244 GHz to 246 GHz is an ISM band, and all users must accept interference caused by ISM devices.  The ITU's allocations are the same in all three ITU Regions.

List of notable frequencies 
245 GHz ISM band center frequency
248.000 to 248.001 GHz Satellite and narrow band modes

Distance records 
The current world distance record on the 1 mm band was  set by US stations WA1ZMS and W4WWQ on January 21, 2008.

In Australia, the 1 mm distance record was  set by stations VK4FD/4 and VK4CSD/4 on December 5, 2019.

See also 
Amateur radio frequency allocations

References

External links 
 UK Microwave Group's 241 GHz page
 Setting a distance record on 241 GHz - Mount Greylock Expeditionary Force
  First 241 GHz VUCC - Mount Greylock Expeditionary Force

Amateur radio bands